Razaullah Khan (9 September 1937 – 5 November 2012) was a Pakistani cricketer. He played 24 first-class matches for several domestic teams in Pakistan between 1957 and 1973.

References

External links
 

1937 births
2012 deaths
Pakistani cricketers
Sind B cricketers
Hyderabad (Pakistan) cricketers
Khairpur cricketers
Karachi cricketers
People from Sukkur District